Millennium Greens are areas of green space for the benefit of local communities.  245 were created in cities, towns and villages across England to celebrate the turn of the Millennium. Their creation was funded in part by the National Lottery via the Countryside Agency. Each one is different, as local people have had an input into the design of their green.

The project to create 250 Millennium Greens across the turn of the Millennium (2001) was started in 1996  and ended when the last Green was handed over to its own, local charitable trust in perpetuity. Each trust now fundraises for and runs its own green, within the bounds of its trust deed, for the benefit of its local community.

Aims 
The aims of Millennium Greens, as stated in their trust deeds, are as follows:
 Make a substantial contribution to the life of the whole community.
 Be able to be enjoyed by people of all ages and physical abilities.
 Be open and evident to visitors to the Locality as well as inhabitants.
 Be an attractive place for people to take air and exercise, meet others and pursue leisure activities and pastimes consistent with the shared enjoyment of the whole of the land.
Include an area suitable for community events and celebrations.
Include significant "natural" areas, where people can enjoy Nature and wildlife at first hand.
Make a positive contribution to the local environment and respect the established character of the area.
Remain safely and conveniently accessible from Inhabitants' homes.

History 
The project took its inspiration  from the Pocket Park project, started in 1984, which had successfully started the idea of communities being directly involved in the creation and maintenance of new parks.
The Millennium Greens scheme was one of many UK projects funded by the Millennium Commission using National Lottery money.  It was intended to form part of the permanent legacy of the celebrations of the Turn of the Millennium.

Design of the Greens 

The general blueprint for the design and creation of Millennium Greens specified both green, natural areas and an area suitable for public events.  In addition the Trust Deeds all specified that no buildings were to be built on the land and not more than 10% of the land should be made/left as hard areas- paving and car parks etc.

Another requirement of the original sponsors was that they would not provide formal sporting grounds and play equipment, so that no pitches or playground apparatus were to be built with their funds.

Every Millennium Green was to have a Feature: some kind of sculpture or other creation on the Green which could act as a focus for the creation of the Green. Various Greens have chosen something inspired by the history or geography of their locality: a statue, water feature, sun-dial etc.  Many of these were unveiled at an official opening ceremony for the Green.

Creation 
The Countryside Agency administered the creation of the Greens, with regional officers studying grant applications and plans, then surveying land and discussing details with local would-be trustees etc.  The CA's team suffered from the fact that many of their operatives were on short-term contracts to do this work, encouraging them to look for new work elsewhere, then leave before the end of the project.

Wildlife 
Because having a wildlife area is a part of the aims of creating and running a Millennium Green most Millennium Green trusts maintain an interest in the wildlife of their Greens. Most websites relating to each Green have something to say about the wildlife on their Greens and many have photos and lists of species.

Legacy 
By the end of the scheme, 245 out of the planned 250 Greens were created.  Whilst some lessons were learnt about creating such schemes, the Countryside Agency considered the project such a success that it launched a follow-on project to continue creating locally-run public green areas called "Doorstep Greens" in 2001.  The CA's successor, Natural England has evaluated both schemes and identified some weaknesses  in the plans for both Pocket Parks and Millennium Greens that have made them difficult to create and maintain in perpetuity.  Millennium Greens and Doorstep Greens have won numerous Green Pennant Awards. The Royal Mail celebrated the Millennium Green project in its People and Places stamps in the Millennium Collection in 2000.

The Greens were intended to last in perpetuity and, as such, each was set up with a trust deed including requirements to keep the land and have it available for access by the general public.  As a charitable trust their operation is controlled by the Charity Commission.  Many Millennium Greens were established with formal links to other charities and official bodies.  Their deeds enable them to work with commercial sponsors and indeed a number of Greens have used sponsorship to further their aims.

However, as the Greens are reliant on local volunteers to keep going, including finding new trustees and fundraising, not all volunteer-run trusts have survived; a number have been changed by Natural England and the Charity Commission; usually the Local Authority ends up being the trustee of the Green.  Whilst the object of the creation was for the Greens to last in perpetuity, with most of them given a 999 year lease, nevertheless, they are vulnerable to compulsory purchase if the local authority wants to change the use of the land.

See also 
Pocket park
Millennium wood

References

External links 
Natural England Site-MM Green Page
Green Flag Site
Millennium Green wiki

Environment of the United Kingdom
Turn of the third millennium